The 12267/12268 Mumbai Central–Hapa Duronto Express is a Superfast Express train belonging to Western Railway zone that runs between  and  in India. It is currently being operated with 12267/12268 train numbers on daily basis.

The train had its inaugural run on 22 December 2009.

Coach composition

The train has standard LHB rakes with max speed of 130 kmph. The train consists of 16 coaches :

 1 AC First Class
 3 AC II Tier
 10 AC III Tier
 2 End On Generator

Service

The 12267/Mumbai Central - Hapa Duronto Express has an average speed of 65 km/hr and covers 815 km in 12 hrs 35 mins.

The 12268/Hapa - Mumbai Central Duronto Express has an average speed of 66 km/hr and covers 815 km in 12 hrs 20 mins.

Route and halts 

The important halts of the train are:

Schedule

Gallery

Traction

Dual-traction WCAM 2/2P locos would haul the train between Mumbai Central &  until at least March 2012 although Western Railway completed DC electric conversion to AC on 5 February 2012.

It is now regularly hauled by a Vadodara-based WAP-5 or WAP-7 locomotive. After , it is regularly hauled by a Vatva-based WDM-3D and WDM-3A locomotive.

This train skips  & . The only train in Western Railway that skips .

See also

Mumbai Central railway station
Ahmedabad Junction railway station
Rajkot Junction railway station

References

Transport in Mumbai
Transport in Jamnagar
Duronto Express trains
Rail transport in Gujarat
Rail transport in Maharashtra
Railway services introduced in 2009